Bogdan Poniatowski (November 6, 1931 – April 24, 2014) was a Polish rower. He competed in the Men's Coxless Fours event at the 1960 Summer Olympics in Rome, Italy.

Poniatowski died at the age of 82 on April 24, 2014.

References

External links

Bogdan Poniatowski statistics
Bogdan Poniatowski information

1931 births
2014 deaths
Polish male rowers
Olympic rowers of Poland
Rowers at the 1960 Summer Olympics
Sportspeople from Bydgoszcz